Ernest Chitty (6 December 1883 – 8 June 1948) was a New Zealand Anglican clergyman, tutor and organist. He was born in Dunedin, New Zealand on 6 December 1883. In 1906 he became the first blind University graduate in New Zealand. He was buried at Purewa Cemetery in the Auckland suburb of Meadowbank.

References

1883 births
1948 deaths
New Zealand Anglican priests
Musicians from Dunedin
New Zealand classical organists
Male classical organists
20th-century organists
20th-century male musicians
20th-century classical musicians
Burials at Purewa Cemetery
Religious leaders from Dunedin